Herrera is a corregimiento in La Chorrera District, Panamá Oeste Province, Panama with a population of 2,552 as of 2010. Its population as of 1990 was 715; its population as of 2000 was 812.

References

Corregimientos of Panamá Oeste Province